Roy Adams may refer to:

 Roy Adams (cricketer) (born 1989), South African first-class cricketer
 Roy Adams (politician), American politician and businessman serving as a member of the Louisiana House of Representatives from the 62nd district
 Roy Adams (writer), American-Canadian academic, author, adventurer, labour rights activist and poet